Manuel António Tavares Cunha (born 31 August 1962) is a Portuguese former road cyclist. Professional from 1985 to 1994, he most notably won the 1987 Volta a Portugal and the 1987 and 1986 Volta ao Algarve. He also rode in four editions of the Vuelta a España.

Major results

1983
 1st Stage 8 Volta ao Algarve
 7th Overall Volta a Portugal
1st Stage 10
1984
 3rd Overall Volta a Portugal
1st Stage 9b
 3rd Overall Volta ao Algarve
1985
 2nd Overall Volta ao Alentejo
 2nd Porto–Lisboa
 2nd Overall Grande Prémio Jornal de Notícias
 6th Overall Volta a Portugal
1986
 1st  Overall Volta ao Algarve
 1st Overall Grande Prémio do Concelho de Loures
1st Stage 4
 3rd Road race, National Road Championships
 6th Overall Volta a Portugal
1st Prologue (ITT)
1987
 1st  Overall Volta a Portugal
1st Prologue (ITT)
 1st  Overall Volta ao Algarve
 1st  Overall GP Costa Azul
 1st Stage 2 Grande Prémio Jornal de Notícias
 1st Overall Grande Prémio de Pereiro-Macao
1st Stage 3
 1st Overall Clássica de Alcochete
1st Stage 1
 1st Grande Prémio Internacional Costa Azul
 1st Prologue GP Costa Azul
1988
 1st Stage 2 Tour des Trois Cantons
 2nd Overall Vuelta a los Valles Mineros
 6th Overall Volta a Portugal
1st Stage 9
1990
 1st  Overall GP Costa Azul
1st Stage 3
 3rd Overall Volta ao Algarve
 7th Overall Volta a Portugal
1991
 1st  Overall Grande Prémio Jornal de Notícias
1st Prologue & Stage 5
 1st Overall Grande Prémio do Minho
1st Stage 8b
 1st Overall Grande Prémio Gondomar
1st Stage 3
 1st Stage 7 Volta a Portugal
1992
 1st Overall Grande Prémio Gondomar
 3rd Overall Volta ao Alentejo
 6th Overall Volta a Portugal
 9th Overall Vuelta a Castilla y León
1993
 3rd Overall Grande Prémio Jornal de Notícias

Grand Tour general classification results timeline

References

External links

1962 births
Living people
Portuguese male cyclists
Sportspeople from Vila Nova de Gaia